Marcel Wauters (born 26 June 1894, date of death unknown) was a Belgian rowing coxswain. He competed in two events at the 1924 Summer Olympics.

References

External links
 

1894 births
Year of death missing
Belgian male rowers
Olympic rowers of Belgium
Rowers at the 1924 Summer Olympics
Place of birth missing
Coxswains (rowing)